
Bielsko County is a unit of territorial administration and local government (powiat) in Silesian Voivodeship, southern Poland. It came into being on January 1, 1999, as a result of the Polish local government reforms passed in 1998. Its administrative seat is the city of Bielsko-Biała, although the city is not part of the county (it constitutes a separate city county).

As of 2019 its total population is 165,374, out of which the population of Czechowice-Dziedzice is 35,926, that of Szczyrk is 5,734, that of Wilamowice is 3,100, and the rural population is 120,614.

Neighbouring counties
Apart from the city of Bielsko-Biała, Bielsko County is also bordered by Pszczyna County and Oświęcim County to the north, Wadowice County to the east, Żywiec County to the south, and Cieszyn County to the west.

Administrative division

The county is subdivided into 10 gminas (one urban, two urban-rural and seven rural). These are listed in the following table, in descending order of population.

See also
 Cieszyn Silesia
 Euroregion Cieszyn Silesia

References

 
Bielsko